Richard May was a speedway rider that rode for Reading Racers and Poole Pirates between 1969 and 1977.

Career
Richard "Dickie" May (born 8 May 1944 in Southampton, England) is a former motorcycle speedway rider. He was the Southern Centre 350cc Solo Grasstrack champion in 1967. In 1970 he was part of the Young England side that faced a Young Sweden side in the Division 2 Test Series tour and won the individual titles of Stadium Trophy (8/6/1970), Suffolk Open Championship (2/7/1970), the Argus Trophy (5/7/1970), the Peter Arnold Memorial Trophy (10/8/1970) and the Reading Open Championship (7 /9/1970). In 1971 he won the Golden Helmet from Ken McKinlay.

While riding for the Reading Racers he was part of the 1973 British League Champions team along with regular riders Anders Michanek, Dag Lövaas, Geoff Curtis, Mick Bell and Bernie Leigh. He also rode for Poole Pirates. While riding for the Pirates he competed in the preliminary round of the British Qualifiers of the 1974 Individual Speedway World Championship and was the leading bonus point scorer that year for Poole.

Speedway writer Arnie Gibbons (author of Tears and Glory ) wrote in the Speedway Plus article "We had Joy, We Had Fun" that after a meet on 5 October 1970, May had become his first speedway hero after scoring a 12 point full maximum which helped the Reading Racers beat Eastbourne.

References

External links
 http://wwosbackup.proboards.com/thread/1973/richard
 http://www.poolepirates.co/club-history-1970s.html
 http://www.speedway-forum.co.uk/forums/index.php?/topic/64373-golden-helmet-memories/&page=2
 http://www.speedwayplus.com/ReadingClosure.shtml

1944 births
English motorcycle racers
British speedway riders
Reading Racers riders
Poole Pirates riders
Living people